Yarrumia is a genus of lichen-forming fungi in the subfamily Lobarioideae of the family Peltigeraceae. It has two foliose species that are found in New Zealand. Lichen products that have been detected in the genus include polyporic acid, pigments and stictane triterpenoids. The genus was circumscribed in 2015 by David John Galloway. The generic name Yarrumia honours James Murray (1923–1961) "who first detected polyporic acid in the two species comprising the genus, and who contributed so much to New Zealand lichenology, subsequent to his initial interest in the chemistry of Yarrumia coronata dating from 1949".

Species
Yarrumia colensoi 
Yarrumia coronata

References

Peltigerales
Lecanoromycetes genera
Lichen genera
Taxa described in 2015
Taxa named by David Galloway (botanist)